Shaykovka (State airfields index: ЬУБЙ), also given variously as Kirov Shaykovka, Anisovo Gorod, Anisovo Gorodishche, Shaykovo, Shajkovka, Gorodische, Chaikovka, is an airbase of the Russian Air Force in Kaluga Oblast, Russia located 17 km north of Kirov, Kaluga Oblast.  It is a large airfield with hangars and an extensive alert area for fighters.  Appears the runway overrun was being built to extend the runway to 3000 m.  In 2000, Tupolev Tu-160, Tupolev Tu-95MS, and Tupolev Tu-22M3 aircraft operated out of this base during a training exercise.  The Natural Resources Defense Council listed the base as a nuclear site in a study.

Units stationed here have included the 73rd gv. iap (73-й гв. иап: гвардейский истребительный авиационный полк  - 73rd Guards Interceptor Aviation Regiment) flying Mikoyan MiG-29 aircraft in the 1990s and 2000s; and the 52nd gv. tbap (152-й гв. тбап: гвардейский тяжелый бомбардировочный авиаполк  - 52nd Guards Heavy Bomber Aviation Regiment) flying Tupolev Tu-16 bombers, taking on 19 Tupolev Tu-22M aircraft starting in 1982, and transitioning to an ITBAP (Instructor Heavy Bomber Aviation Regiment) in 1989.

As of 2020, 52nd Heavy Bomber Regiment of the 22nd Guards Heavy Bomber Division was still reported resident at the base flying Tu-22M3 Backfires. In 2021 Tu-22M3 Backfires from the base forward deployed to Russian bases in Syria for operations and exercises in the region.

Russian invasion of Ukraine

On 27 June 2022, the Russian Armed Forces fired two Kh-22 anti-ship missiles into central Kremenchuk, Poltava Oblast of Ukraine, hitting the Amstor shopping mall and the Kredmash road machinery plant. A fire broke out and the attack killed at least 20 people and injured at least 56.The anti-ship missiles were launched from Russian Tu-22M3 strategic bombers that took off from the Shaykovka air base. 

On 7 October 2022 there were reports of a kamikaze drone attack on the air base, destroying two Tu-22M3 bombers. New satellite imagery was obtained that shows no damage to most of Shaykovka Air Base in Russia.

References

External links
Russian Air Force - people and aircraft: Aircraft at the Shaikovka airfield

Soviet Air Force bases
Soviet Long Range Aviation
Soviet Air Defence Force bases
Russian Air Force bases